Žarko Domljan (14 September 1932 – 5 September 2020) was a Croatian politician who served as the first Speaker of the Croatian Parliament following Croatia's independence from Yugoslavia and as the 11th speaker overall. He served in this position from 30 May 1990 to 2 August 1992. Domljan was later a representative in the Parliamentary Assembly of the Council of Europe.

He died on 5 September 2020 at the age of 87.

References

1932 births
2020 deaths
People from Imotski
Croatian Democratic Union politicians
Representatives in the modern Croatian Parliament
Speakers of the Croatian Parliament
Order of Ante Starčević recipients